The 2021 Vietnamese Women's Football Championship (referred to as the Thai Son Bac Cup for sponsorship reasons) was the 24th season of Vietnamese Women's National League, the professional women's football league in Vietnam. The season began on 13 November 2021 and finished on 25 November 2021. Defending champions Ho Chi Minh City won their 10th title.

The season was set to start in May but was postponed due to the effects of the COVID-19 pandemic. Due to the busy national team schedule with Women's Asian Cup qualification and the postponement of the Southeast Asian Games, it was decided to hold a condensed round-robin tournament in November with just 5 teams.

Teams
The league was expected to expand to 9 clubs from the 2020 season with Phong Phu Ha Nam fielding a second team. However, after the initial start was postponed, Son La withdrew. Hanoi Watabe, Ho Chi Minh City and Phong Phu Ha Nam later decided to not field their second teams.

Personnel and kits

Managerial changes

League table
<onlyinclude>

Results

Positions by round

Season progress

Season statistics

Top scorers

Hat-tricks

Clean sheets

References

External links
Official Page

Vietnam
Vietnam
2021 in Vietnamese football
Vietnam
Vietnamese Women's Football Championship, 2021